Erenköy station is a railway station in Kadıköy, Istanbul. Between 1969 and 2013, it was a station on the Haydarpaşa suburban to Gebze and starting on 10 March 2019, a station on the Marmaray commuter rail system.

The station was originally opened on 22 September 1872 by the Ottoman government as part of the railway from Istanbul to İzmit. Erenköy station was expanded in 1949 by the Turkish State Railways to accommodate more traffic.

Pre-Marmaray station layout

References

External links
Erenköy station house from Google street view

Railway stations in Istanbul Province
Railway stations opened in 1872
Transport in Kadıköy
1872 establishments in the Ottoman Empire